The Journal of Interdisciplinary History is a quarterly peer-reviewed academic journal published by the MIT Press. It covers a broad range of historical themes and periods, linking history to other academic fields.

Contents
The journal features articles, review essays and book reviews, linking history with other fields of academic research, such as economics and demographics. Unlike most other historical journals, the content is not limited to one geographical area or historical period, and covers social, demographic, political, economic, cultural and technological history.

Each issue has 200 pages.

Editors
Since its inception, the Journal of Interdisciplinary History has been edited by Robert Rotberg and Theodore Rabb.

According to the Journal Citation Reports, the journal has a 2014 impact factor of 0.727, ranking it 6th out of 87 journals in the category "History". According to the SCImago Journal Rank it has a h-index of 27.

References

External links
 

English-language journals
History journals
MIT Press academic journals
Quarterly journals
Publications established in 1969